Hasanhati is a village in Kalna II CD block in Kalna subdivision of Purba Bardhaman district in West Bengal, India.

Etymology
There are many opinions about it. These are:
In Manasamangal Kāvya, the daughter-in-law of Chand Soudagor, Behula was taking her dead husband, Lakhindar, to cure him. Then the villagers were laughing at him. Laughing is said 'Hasa'(হাসা) in local language. So the Village is named as Hasanhati(হাসনহাটি).
Some say that the village is named due to the worship of Hansweswari Devi.
According to the Islamic Theory, the village is named due to Pirbaba Hasan Hasan.

Geography
It is surrounded by the villages named Udaypur, Mirhat, Amdabad, Ramnagar, Narkeldanga, Baidyapur, etc.

A river named Behula flows beside it.

Demographics
As per the 2011 Census of India Hasanhati had a total population of 1,475, of which 738 (50%) were males and 737 (50%) were females. Population below 6 years was 159. The total number of literates in Hasanhati was 972 (73.86% of the population over 6 years).

Transport
Bainchigram and Boinchi are the nearest railway stations to Baidyapur, whilst Kalna is 17 km away, however the nearest major railway station is at Bardhaman, 44 km away.

Education
There is one Primary School in the village. Its name is Hasanhati Tulsidas Primary School.

References

Villages in Purba Bardhaman district